"All I Know" is a song by London-based drum and bass producers, DJ Matrix & Futurebound. The song was released in the United Kingdom on 6 May 2012 for digital download. The song features vocals from Luke Bingham.

Music video
A music video to accompany the release of "All I Know" was first released onto YouTube on 23 April 2012 at a total length of three minutes and twenty-two seconds. As of March 2016 it has received over 3 million views.

Track listings

Chart performance

Release history

References

2012 singles
Matrix & Futurebound songs
2011 songs